Jerome Dieu Donne Meyinsse (born December 18, 1988) is an American professional basketball player for Ironi Ness Ziona of the Israeli Basketball Premier League. At a height of 2.08 m (6' 10") tall, he plays at the center position.

Personal life
Because of his fluency in the Portuguese language, and his quick adaptation to the Brazilian culture, Meyinsse became a fan favorite in Rio de Janeiro, while he was playing with Flamengo. He was nicknamed, "The Big One", by Flamengo supporters, and was one of the most popular basketball players in Brazil at the time. Meyinsse has often been the subject of local news articles, due to his posts on Instagram.

High school
Born and raised in Baton Rouge, Louisiana, Meyinsse attended and played basketball at McKinley Senior High School ('06). He averaged 18.5 points, 11 rebounds, five blocked shots, and three assists per game as a senior. He was the team's captain, and earned Class 4A All-State Second Team honors. He was also selected to play with the East Team, in the Louisiana High School Coaches Association All-Star Game.

College career
After high school, Meyinsse played college basketball at the University of Virginia, with the Virginia Cavaliers.

College statistics

|-
| align="left" | 2006–07
| align="left" | Virginia
| 15 ||0 || 6.7 || .364 || .000 || .692 || 1.3 || 0.1 || 0.1 || .1 || 1.1
|-
| align="left" | 2007–08
| align="left" | Virginia
| 26 || 0 || 7.2 || .697 || .000 || .333 || 1.9 || 0.1 || 0.1 || .1 || 1.9
|-
| align="left" | 2008–09
| align="left" | Virginia
| 17 || 1 || 8.8 || .400 || .000 || .591 || 1.6 || 0.1 || 0.1 || .4 || 1.7
|-
| align="left" | 2009–10
| align="left" | Virginia
| 31 || 23 || 22.3 || .580 || .000 || .747 || 4.1 || 0.4 || 0.3 || .7 || 6.5
|-
| Career ||  || 89 || 24 || 12.7 || .568 || .000 || .783 || 2.5 || 0.3 || 0.2 || .4 || 3.4

Professional career
Meyinsse began his pro career in 2010, and has played with several clubs in Argentina and Brazil. In 2011-12 playing for Estudiantes de Bahía Blanca in Argentina, he averaged 15.3 points (8th in the league), 6.4 rebounds, and 1.2 blocks (2nd) per game. In January 2013, he was cut by Sionista, and he then joined Regatas Corrientes. Meyinsse made a quick adjustment to his new team, and with them he won Argentina's top-tier level league, the  Liga Nacional de Básquet (LNB), in May 2013.

Meyinsse's next step in his career was to play with Flamengo, of Brazil's top-tier level Novo Basquete Brasil (NBB). Along with his Argentinian friend, point guard Nicolás Laprovíttola, and Brazilian shooting guard Vítor Benite, Meyinsse had success in Brazil. He won several tournaments with Flamengo.

For the 2016–17 season, Meyinsse joined San Lorenzo de Almagro, of the Liga Nacional de Basquet (LNB). With San Lorenzo, Meyinsse won the Argentine League championship for the second time, while playing under head coach Julio Lamas. For the 2017–18 season, he joined the Argentine League club Atenas de Córdoba.

On November 22, 2020, he signed with Ironi Nes Ziona of the Israeli Basketball Premier League.

On June 17, 2021, he signed with Sendai 89ers of the B.League.

In the summer of 2022, he signed with Ironi Ness Ziona of the Israeli Basketball Premier League.

NBB career statistics

NBB regular season

NBB playoffs

Awards and accomplishments
FIBA Intercontinental Cup Champion: (2014)
2× Brazilian League Champion: (2014, 2015)
Brazilian All-Star: (2014)
Brazilian League Finals MVP: (2014)

References

External links
Official Twitter Account
LatinBasket.com Profile
Draftexpress.com Profile 
NBB Player Profile 
Virginia Cavaliers College Bio 

1988 births
Living people
Aguacateros de Michoacán players
American expatriate basketball people in Argentina
American expatriate basketball people in Brazil
American expatriate basketball people in Mexico
American expatriate basketball people in Venezuela
American expatriate basketball people in Israel
American men's basketball players
Atenas basketball players
Basketball players from Baton Rouge, Louisiana
Centers (basketball)
Estudiantes de Bahía Blanca basketball players
Flamengo basketball players
Ironi Nes Ziona B.C. players
Juventud Sionista basketball players
Novo Basquete Brasil players
Power forwards (basketball)
Regatas Corrientes basketball players
San Lorenzo de Almagro (basketball) players
Trotamundos B.B.C. players
Virginia Cavaliers men's basketball players